The 1996 Saskatchewan Roughriders finished in 4th place in the West Division with a 5–13 record and missed the playoffs for the second consecutive season.

Offseason

CFL draft

Preseason

Regular season

Season standings

Season schedule

Roster

Awards and records

CFL All-Star Selections
Robert Mimbs, Running Back

Western All-Star Selections
Robert Mimbs, Running Back

Milestones

References

Saskatchewan Roughriders seasons
Saskatchewan
1996 in Saskatchewan